Farewell Keystone is a live album by American jazz vibist Bobby Hutcherson recorded in 1982 at Keystone Korner in San Francisco and released on the Theresa label in 1988. The 1992 Evidence CD reissue added a bonus track.

Reception
Allmusic awarded the album 4 stars stating "it is not surprising that the music is hard bop-oriented and of consistent high quality".

Track listing
 "Crescent Moon" (Billy Higgins) - 7:11    
 "Short Stuff" (Harold Land) - 6:47    
 "Prism" (Buster Williams) - 6:56    
 "Starting Over" (Heads Up) - (Bobby Hutcherson) - 10:52    
 "Rubber Man" (Cedar Walton) - 6:53    
 "Mapenzi" (Land) - 13:29 Bonus track on CD reissue

Personnel
Bobby Hutcherson - vibraphone
Oscar Brashear - trumpet
Harold Land - tenor saxophone
Cedar Walton - piano
Buster Williams - bass
Billy Higgins - drums

References 

Theresa Records live albums
Bobby Hutcherson live albums
1988 live albums